A matrix grammar is a formal grammar in which instead of single productions, productions are grouped together into finite sequences. A production cannot be applied separately, it must be applied in sequence. In the application of such a sequence of productions, the rewriting is done in accordance to each production in sequence, the first one, second one etc. till the last production has been used for rewriting. The sequences are referred to as matrices.

Matrix grammar is an extension of context-free grammar, and one instance of a controlled grammar.

Formal definition 
A matrix grammar is an ordered quadruple

where
  is a finite set of non-terminals
  is a finite set of terminals
  is a finite set of non-empty sequences whose elements are ordered pairs  where

The sequences are called matrices and can be written as

Let  be the set of all productions appearing in the matrices  of a matrix grammar . Then the matrix grammar  is of type-, length-increasing, linear, -free, context-free or context-sensitive if and only if the grammar  has the following property.

For any ,  holds if and only if there exists an integer  such that the words

over V exist and
  and 
  is one of the matrices of 

Let  be the reflexive transitive closure of the relation . Then, the language generated by the matrix grammar  is given by

Examples 
Consider the matrix grammar

where  is a collection containing the following matrices:

These matrices, which contain only context-free rules, generate the context-sensitive language

The associate word of 

is
 and 
.

Consider the matrix grammar

where  is a collection containing the following matrices:

These matrices, which contain only context-regular rules, generate the context-sensitive language

The associate word of 

is
 and 
.

Properties 
Let MAT^\lambda be the class of languages produced by matrix grammars, and  the class of languages produced by -free matrix grammars.
 Trivially,  is included in MAT^\lambda.
  is closed under union, concatenation, intersection with regular languages and permutation.
 All languages in  can be produced by a context-sensitive grammar.
 There exists a context-sensitive language which does not belong to MAT^\lambda .
 Each language produced by a matrix grammar with only one terminal symbol is regular.

Open problems 

References

Footnotes 
  Ábrahám, S. Some questions of language theory. International Conference on Computational Linguistic, 1965. pp 1–11. 
  Gheorghe Păun, Membrane Computing: An Introduction, Springer-Verlag New York, Inc., Secaucus, NJ, USA, 2002. pp 30–32

Formal languages